The Fitzpatrick Wilderness is located in Shoshone National Forest in the U.S. state of Wyoming. The wilderness was originally known as the Glacier Primitive Area, but was redesignated a wilderness in 1976.

Overview
U.S. Wilderness Areas do not allow motorized or mechanized vehicles, including bicycles. Although camping and fishing are allowed with proper permit, no roads or buildings are constructed and there is also no logging or mining, in compliance with the 1964 Wilderness Act. Wilderness areas within National Forests and Bureau of Land Management areas also allow hunting in season.

Hazards

Encountering bears is a concern in the Wind River Range. There are other concerns as well, including bugs, wildfires, adverse snow conditions and nighttime cold temperatures.

Importantly, there have been notable incidents, including accidental deaths, due to falls from steep cliffs (a misstep could be fatal in this class 4/5 terrain) and due to falling rocks, over the years, including 1993, 2007 (involving an experienced NOLS leader), 2015 and 2018. Other incidents include a seriously injured backpacker being airlifted near SquareTop Mountain in 2005, and a fatal hiker incident (from an apparent accidental fall) in 2006 that involved state search and rescue. The U.S. Forest Service does not offer updated aggregated records on the official number of fatalities in the Wind River Range.

See also
 List of U.S. Wilderness Areas

References

External links
 
 
 

Greater Yellowstone Ecosystem
IUCN Category Ib
1976 establishments in Wyoming
Protected areas of Fremont County, Wyoming
Protected areas of Sublette County, Wyoming
Shoshone National Forest
Wilderness areas of Wyoming